Abercrombie is an unincorporated community in Bibb County, in the U.S. state of Alabama.

History
The community was founded in the 19th century and named for the family of Alford Abercrombie. A post office was established here in 1881, and remained in operation until it was discontinued in 1906.

Demographics
According to the census returns from 1850-2010 for Alabama, it has never reported a population figure separately on the U.S. Census.

References

Unincorporated communities in Bibb County, Alabama
Unincorporated communities in Alabama